Nicolas Morn (23 February 1932 – 14 March 1997) was a Luxembourgian cyclist. He competed in the individual and team road race events at the 1952 Summer Olympics.

References

External links
 

1932 births
1997 deaths
Luxembourgian male cyclists
Olympic cyclists of Luxembourg
Cyclists at the 1952 Summer Olympics
People from Troisvierges